Rose Melberg is a musician and songwriter from Sacramento, California, currently based in Vancouver, British Columbia, Canada. She has performed both as a solo artist and as a member of Tiger Trap, The Softies, Go Sailor, Gaze, Gigi, Imaginary Pants, Brave Irene, Knife Pleats and Olivia's World.

Melberg was raised by working musicians and following her appearance right out of high school at the International Pop Underground Convention in Olympia, Washington in August 1991, she had almost instant success with the all-female band Tiger Trap. The short-lived band garnered a cult following in indie-pop circles. In 2002 she gave birth to a son and lived with her husband and family in Summerland, British Columbia, Canada. She returned to the pop world in 2006 with her second solo album, Cast Away the Clouds. Melberg toured briefly for the album, including a spot opening for Belle and Sebastian. Her third solo album, Homemade Ship, was released on K Records in 2009. The track "Old Days" was featured as Song Of The Day by NPR Music.

As of 2011, she was a part of two groups Brave Irene and Imaginary Pants. In 2019, the band Olivia's World, featuring Melberg along with Lica Rezende and Joe Saxby, released its debut EP.

Discography

Solo recordings 
 "My Day," from the International Pop Underground Convention compilation (K Records, 1991)
Cupid (Sam Cooke cover), 7-inch split w/ Magpies I Want a Love I can See (I Wish I Was a Slumberland Record #3, 1994). Sleeve by Adrian Tomine, colored by hand.
 Portola (Double Agent, 1998)
 "The Time Has Come" (Anne Briggs cover) (Double Agent, 2005)
 Cast Away The Clouds (Double Agent, 2006)
 Each New Day (Guitar Version) b/w Autumn (Double Agent, 2008)
 Homemade Ship (K, 2009)
 "This Will Be Our Year," originally by The Zombies (Double Agent, 2011)
 "Our Days In Kansas," from the Wish I'd Kept A Scrapbook: A Tribute to Tullycraft compilation (Unchikun Records, 2010)
 September, a covers album released only on cassette (Lost Sound Tapes, 2013)
 "Distant Ships" (Kingfisher Bluez, 2013)
 "Please," cover of Please, Please, Please Let Me Get What I Want by The Smiths from Carry On Rioting compilation (Tuff Enuff, 2013)

 Tiger Trap 
 "Words and Smiles" split 7-inch with Bratmobile (Four Letter Words Records, 1992)
 "Supercrush" b/w "You and Me"/"Hiding" [volume 36 of the "International Pop Underground" singles series] (K Records, 1992)
 Tiger Trap (K Records, 1993)
 Sour Grass EP (K Records, 1993)
 "Baby Blue," from Julep (Another Yoyo Studio Compilation) (Yoyo Recordings, 1993)
 "Hiding," from the International Hip Swing compilation [compiled from songs from the "International Pop Underground" series] (K Records, 1993)
 "Supreme Nothing," from the Stars Kill Rock compilation (Kill Rock Stars, 1993)

 Go Sailor 
 Fine Day for Sailing 7-inch EP (Yo Yo, 1994)
 Long Distance 7-inch EP (Slumberland, 1995)
 Don't Go 7-inch EP (Lookout!, 1996)
 Go Sailor (Lookout!, 1996): Compiles the three 7-inch EPs plus two compilation tracks

 The Softies 
 It's Love (K Records, 1995)
 Loveseat 7-inch EP (Slumberland, 1995)
 The Softies (aka "He'll Never Have to Know") 7-inch EP (K Records, 1995)
 The Softies (Slumberland, 1996)
 "The Best Days" b/w "As Skittish as Me"/"Stranger" (K Records, 1997)
 Winter Pageant (K Records, 1997)
 Holiday in Rhode Island (K Records, 2000)

 Gaze 
 Mitsumeru (K Records, 1998)
 So Sad (To Watch Good Love Go Bad) 7-inch EP (Septophilia, 1998)
 Shake the Pounce (K Records, 1999)

 Brave Irene 
 Brave Irene (Slumberland Records, 2011)

 Tally Ho! 
 I Never Will Marry (WIAIWYA, 2012)

 PUPS 
 PUPS (Green Burrito Records, 2013)
 Month Long Sleep 7-inch EP (WIAIWYA, 2013)

 Imaginary Pants 
 Imaginary Pants (Lost Sound Tapes, 2012)
 Channels b/w Seacliff 7-inch EP (Rok Lok Records, 2013)
 Kites At Night EP (Lost Sound Tapes, 2014)

 Knife Pleats 
 Hat Bark Beach (Lost Sound Tapes/WIAIWYA, 2015)

 Olivia's World 
 Olivia's World (Lost Sound Tapes, 2019)

As producer
 Lisa Prank, Perfect Love Song (Lost Sound Tapes, 2019)

Live collaborations
 "The Biggest Lie" (Elliott Smith, Stinkweeds, AZ)

Collaborations
The Potatomen – "All My Yesterdays" – vocals on 3 tracks (1996, Lookout Records)
The Smugglers – "Rosie" – from Rosie (2000, Lookout Records)
Rose Melberg & Gregory Webster – "Merry Christmas (I Don't Want To Fight Tonight)", originally by Ramones
The Bright Ideas – "All Is Calm, All Is Bright!" – vocals on "When You Think About Christmas Time" (2000, Popgun Recordings)
Rose Melberg & Nick Krgovich – "The Mental Beast Christmas Compilation" – "Coldest Night of the Year", originally by Vashti Bunyan (2009)
Gigi – Maintenant'' – vocals on "Alone at the Pier" (2010 Tomlab Records)
Blanket Truth – "Urban Wildlife" – vocals on "Friendly Haunted Mansion", "Bubble Up" (2012, Lost Sound Tapes)
Jay Arner – "Bad Friend b/w Black Horse" – drums (2012)

References

External links 

 www.doubleagentrecords.com/rose – Official website
Rose Melberg music on Bandcamp

Year of birth missing (living people)
Living people
American expatriates in Canada
American women drummers
American women guitarists
American pop musicians
American indie rock musicians
American rock songwriters
American rock singers
American rock drummers
Musicians from Vancouver
Musicians from Sacramento, California
Singer-songwriters from California
Guitarists from California